Götzendorf an der Leitha is a village in the district of Bruck an der Leitha in Lower Austria in Austria.

Up until the end of the Cold War it was the headquarters of the 9th Panzergrenadier Brigade of the 1st Panzergrenadier Division with the 9th Panzer Staff Battalion (12x M42 Duster); 33rd Panzer Battalion (54x M60 Patton); 35th Panzergrenadier Battalion (65x Saurer SPzA1 IFVs, 12x SK-105 Kürassier, 8x SPzA1GrW 81mm mortars); 1st Jagdpanzer (Tank-destroyer) Battalion (60x SK-105 Kürassier); and the 9th Panzer Artillery Battalion (18x M109 155mm howitzer).

Geography
Götzendorf an der Leitha lies in the industrial area of Lower Austria. About 4.76 percent of the municipality is forested.

References

Cities and towns in Bruck an der Leitha District